Three Sixty Residences is a 22-storey,  residential skyscraper in downtown San Jose, California. It is the fourth tallest building in the city. Originally built to be a condominium tower, the vacant Three Sixty was converted to luxury rental apartment units in 2010 after the down-turn in local real estate market.

References

External links
  Three Sixty Residences official website

Residential buildings completed in 1988
Skyscrapers in San Jose, California
Residential skyscrapers in California